Greg Carr (born October 8, 1985) is a professional arena football wide receiver who is currently a free agent. After playing college football at Florida State, Carr was signed by the San Diego Chargers as an undrafted free agent in 2009. Carr has also been a member of the Winnipeg Blue Bombers, Edmonton Eskimos, Saskatchewan Roughriders, Calgary Stampeders, Orlando Predators and Washington Valor.  In June of 2020, Carr was hired as the Head Football Coach at North Marion High School in Citra, FL.

Early years
Carr played high school football at North Marion High School in Citra, Florida. He earned first-team all-state honors in Class 3A as a junior and senior. He was also a star basketball player, earning first-team honors during his senior year.

College career
During Carr's freshman year he led all Florida State receivers in yards per reception with 20.6 and receiving touchdowns with nine. He also tied former Virginia Cavaliers and current Pittsburgh Steelers tight end Heath Miller's ACC record for receiving touchdowns by a freshman. His great season earned him second-team All-ACC and third-team freshman All-American. During his sophomore year, he made 34 receptions for 619 yards and 12 touchdowns, helping him earn a second-team All-ACC selection. During his junior campaign he made 45 receptions for 795 and four touchdowns. As a senior Carr made 39 receptions for 542 yards and four touchdowns.

Carr finished his career at Florida State ranking fifth in the school's history in career receptions and receiving yards with 148 receptions for 2,574 yards, and second in touchdowns with 29.

Professional career

San Diego Chargers
He was not drafted in the 2009 NFL Draft and signed with the San Diego Chargers after the draft. The Chargers waived Carr on August 31.

Winnipeg Blue Bombers
Greg Carr was added to the Winnipeg Blue Bombers Practice Roster September 1, 2010.  He was activated for the game against the Montreal Alouettes on September 25.  His first catch in the CFL was a 74-yard touchdown, his second catch was a 71-yard touchdown. Carr left the game in the third quarter with a leg injury but had caught 4 passes for 185 yards and 2 touchdowns.

Edmonton Eskimos
After becoming a free agent, Carr signed with the Edmonton Eskimos on February 16, 2012.

Saskatchewan Roughriders
On September 5, 2012, Carr was traded along with a fifth round draft pick in the 2013 CFL Draft to the Saskatchewan Roughriders for the playing rights to Matthew O'Donnell and a fourth round draft pick in the 2013 CFL Draft. Carr had 2 touchdown receptions in the Western Divisional Semi-Final against the Stampeders on November 11, 2012, including what looked like it would be the game-winner with only 53 seconds left. After playing in the 2013 CFL season opener, the Roughriders released Carr.

Calgary Stampeders
Carr was signed by the Stampeders on July 8, 2013, but after playing in only four games, he was released on September 9, 2013.

Washington Valor
On October 14, 2016, Carr was assigned to the Washington Valor during the dispersal draft.

Albany Empire 
On March 21, 2018, Carr was assigned to the Albany Empire.

References

External links

1985 births
Living people
American football wide receivers
American players of Canadian football
Canadian football wide receivers
Calgary Stampeders players
Edmonton Elks players
Florida State Seminoles football players
Orlando Predators players
San Diego Chargers players
Saskatchewan Roughriders players
Washington Valor players
Winnipeg Blue Bombers players
Albany Empire (AFL) players
People from Citra, Florida
Players of American football from Florida